Siege of Virovitica, was one of the first battles of Croatian-Slavonian theater during Great Turkish War. The siege took place in July 1684, and it ended with the Ottoman garrison's surrender and Habsburg-Croatian capture of town. Due to its capture in early phase of the war, the town became a vital Habsburg base for further operations in Slavonia.

Background 

In 1683, the twenty-year-long peace, concluded by the Vasvar peace treaty ended, and Ottoman Porte decided to renew its hostilities against the Habsburg Empire. The large Ottoman Army, attempted to capture Habsburg capital of Vienna in 1683, but suffered a crushing defeat, which also ended with the formation of anti-Ottoman alliance, The Holy League, and the beginning of the Great Turkish War.

Prior to the Great Turkish War, much of Hungary and Slavonia were conquered by the Ottomans, while Croatia was reduced to "remnants of the remnants" of what it once was. As a result of Ottoman conquests, center of the Croatian medieval state gradually moved northwards into Slavonia (Zagreb). Captured Croatian, Slavonian and Hungarian lands in previous centuries were made Ottoman sanjaks within Ottoman Empire.

With the Imperial Habsburg Army launching its campaigns to recapture Hungary, in Croatia and its Military Frontier, armies of Croatian ban and Frontier commanders, began their own preparations for offensive campaigns into Ottoman-ruled Slavonia. The closest such lands were the territories of Sanjak of Požega, whose town of Virovitica represented the most frontal Ottoman fort, and thus also its most vulnerable outpost. Its capture by the Habsburgs would also permit further offensive actions directed towards Valpovo and Osijek.

By the end of June 1684, the war preparations began near Đurđevac. By 3 July 1684, most of the Habsburg army was assembled and ready. Croatian ban Nikola Erdody, entrusted the supreme command of this army to general James Leslie. As a preparatory measure, local military commanders also intentionally spread false rumours about their main armies heading to Hungary, instead of actually launching their own offensives in Slavonia.

The siege 
Leslie marched it his army to Virovitica. Upon encamping there, he commenced artillery bombardment of the city walls, using two batteries he had at his disposal. Nonetheless, first few days of the siege proved unfruitful, due to solid land barricades and other fortifications, which provided cover from the Croatian cannon fire. The town defenders also covered the raining projectiles with wet clothes in order to mitigate their destructiveness, while also repelling charges directed at the city.

Leslie then decided to further increase the pressure by ordering two infantry regiments to close off all approaches, encircling the town completely. The attacking army soon received news of Ottoman reinforcements going their way from Slatina, in order to lift the siege. Upon learning this, Leslie ordered general Trautmansdorf to take his army and intercept the incoming reinforcements. Trautmansdorf, therefore took his men on a forced march throughout the night and managed to surprise the relief force by successfully attacking them using his cavalry and infantry. In his surprise attack, Trautmansdorf's contingent took out large number of Turks, while also capturing at least 200 alive. The captured Turk prisoners were then marched back to Virovitica and demonstrated before town defenders, thus letting them know they will receive no help. The town garrison, upon seeing captured Turks of the relief party, while also receiving permission to leave town unharmed, decided to surrender to general Leslie on 25 July 1684.

Aftermath 
The capture of Virovitica became early major success for The Imperials, which opened perspective of launching new offensives towards Požega and even Osijek. Later was - at a time - a vital traffic and supply hub for the Ottoman-controlled Slavonia and Hungary. Imperial success at Virovitica also forced Ottoman troops to withdraw towards Orahovica and Našice, while vengeful locals burnt down houses of their former local Ottoman overlords.

References 

Virovitica
Virovitica
Virovitica
17th-century military history of Croatia
Virovitica